Dan Gutstein (born in Cleveland, Ohio in 1968) is an American writer and vocalist. His writing has appeared in Ploughshares, Poets & Writers, Best American Poetry, storySouth, PANK, DIAGRAM, Fiction,  and elsewhere.  He has received grants and awards from the Maryland State Arts Council, Arts and Humanities Council of Montgomery County, Maryland, Bread Loaf Writers' Conference, and the University of Michigan, where he earned an MFA in creative writing. While he was teaching at George Washington University the web site Rate My Professors named him the 2010–2011 "hottest" professor in America.       

Gutstein is a vocalist and lyricist for punk band Joy on Fire.

Books
 non/fiction (Edge Books: Washington, DC: 2010) http://www.spdbooks.org/Producte/9781890311254/nonfiction.aspx
 Bloodcoal & Honey (Washington Writers' Publishing House, DC: 2011) https://www.amazon.com/Bloodcoal-Honey-Dan-Gutstein/dp/093184696X/ref=sr_1_1?s=books&ie=UTF8&qid=1312397094&sr=1-1
Alt Tk (Dusie Kollektiv, Zurich, Switzerland 2013). http://www.dusie.org/kollektiv6.html
Buildings Without Murders (Atmosphere Press: Austin, TX: 2020). https://atmospherepress.com/books/buildings-without-murders-by-dan-gutstein/
Metacarpalism (Unsolicited Press: Portland, OR: 2022). https://www.unsolicitedpress.com/store/p355/metacarpalism.html

Selected works in anthologies
"What Can Disappear," in The Penguin Book of the Sonnet ed. Phyllis Levin (New York: Penguin, 2001). https://www.penguinrandomhouse.com/books/333350/the-penguin-book-of-the-sonnet-by-various/9780140589290/
"Monsieur Pierre Est Mort," in Best American Poetry 2006 ed. Billy Collins (New York: Scribner, 2007). http://www.bestamericanpoetry.com/pages/volumes/?id=2006
"Merryland," in Verse Daily (2007.)  
"The Fox Who Loves Me + Other Developments in the Faunal and Floral Kingdoms," in Best American Poetry Blog Pick of the Week, edited by Terence Winch.

References 

1968 births
Living people
American short story writers
American male poets
Maryland Institute College of Art faculty
University of Michigan alumni
George Washington University faculty
American male short story writers